Slettebø is a Norwegian surname. Notable people with the surname include:

Harald Bjarne Slettebø (1922–2018), Norwegian school worker and politician
Ståle Slettebø (born 1964), Norwegian footballer

Norwegian-language surnames